Arkadi Halperin (born 21 May 1992) is an Israeli-Russian former professional association football player.

Biography

Playing career 
After seeing the pitch with FC Khimki in Russia, Halperin landed a trial at Olympique de Marseille in France. Halperin was later invited to join Israeli club, Maccabi Haifa, on trial where he would be eligible for an Israeli passport under the Law of Return. Upon completion of the trial period at Maccabi Haifa, Halperin was sent home without a contract offer. In January 2012, Halperin entered into negotiations with Maccabi Petah Tikva.

Statistics

Footnotes

External links 
  Profile on Championat.com
  Profile at IFA

1992 births
Living people
Russian Jews
Footballers from Moscow
Jewish footballers
Russian footballers
FC Khimki players
AZAL PFK players
Hapoel Nof HaGalil F.C. players
Maccabi Ironi Kiryat Ata F.C. players
Liga Leumit players
Russian emigrants to Israel
Expatriate footballers in Moldova
Expatriate footballers in Azerbaijan
Expatriate footballers in Georgia (country)
Russian expatriate sportspeople in Moldova
Russian expatriate sportspeople in Azerbaijan
Russian expatriate sportspeople in Georgia (country)
Association football midfielders
FC Shevardeni-1906 Tbilisi players